The splendid climbing mouse (Rhipidomys nitela) is a rodent species from South America. It is found in Brazil, French Guiana, Guyana, Suriname and Venezuela.

References

Rhipidomys
Mammals described in 1901
Taxa named by Oldfield Thomas